This is a list of medical schools located in Syria.

References

 
 
Medical school
Syria